The Volvo B12M is an underfloor mid-engined bus/coach chassis introduced by Volvo Buses in 2002 as a replacement for the Volvo B10M. It is available with a variety of bodies such as the Van Hool T9 Alizee, Sunsundegui Sideral and Plaxton Panther/Paragon. Large British users of the B12M include Wallace Arnold, Park's Motor Group and Southern Vectis.

In Brazil, the B12M replaced the B10M in articulated/bi-articulated versions, not being built in a solo bus version like its predecessors B58E and B10M, and is produced since 2004. Also, in Curitiba, there are bi-articulated buses on Volvo B12M chassis in a 28-meter configuration, making them some of the world's longest buses. Since 2011, the B12M was renamed as B340M, and the chassis was updated to the Proconve P7/Euro V emission standard rules in the following year. Both articulated and bi-articulated versions are rated for 340 hp.

See also 

 List of buses

B12M
Mid-engined vehicles
Bus chassis